Herbert Fuller Wernham (1879 - 1941) was a British botanist, who from 1909 to 1929 worked at the British Museum, as an assistant in the botany department. From 1911 to 1921 he published extensively on tropical plants and many genera, retiring in 1921 due to ill health (alcoholism).

Names published 
He published 603 names, including
Acrocephalus klossii Wernham, J. Nat. Hist. Soc. Siam iv. 142 (1921). (now a synonym of Platostoma cochinchinense (Lour.) A.J.Paton)
Alibertia pedicellata Wernham, Bull. Misc. Inform. Kew 1914(2): 66 (1914) (now a synonym of Sphinctanthus polycarpus (H.Karst.) Hook.f.)
Anthocleista microphylla Wernham, Cat. Pl. Oban 67 (1913).
Cowiea borneensis Wernham, J. Linn. Soc., Bot. xlii. 97 (1914).
Fagraea carstensensis Trans. Linn. Soc. London, Bot. 9(1): 111 (1916).

Publications 
(incomplete)

Honours
He is honoured in the ganus & species names:
Wernhamia S.Moore
 Psychotria wernhamiana S.Moore, J. Bot. 65: 269 (1927).
 Tricalysia wernhamiana (Hutch. & Dalziel) Keay, Bull. Jard. Bot. État Bruxelles 28: 291 (1958).
Cremaspora wernhamiana Hutch. & Dalziel, Fl. W. Trop. Afr. [Hutchinson & Dalziel] ii. 85 (1931).

References 

British botanists
1941 deaths
1879 births